Abrosovo is a rural locality (a village) in Bogoslovskoye Rural Settlement of Pestovsky District, Novgorod Oblast, Russia. The population was 43 as of 2010.

Geography 
Abrosovo is located 40 km northwest of Pestovo (the district's administrative centre) by road. Zaruchevye-1 is the nearest rural locality.

References 

Rural localities in Novgorod Oblast